Daumantas or Dovmont (Russian: Довмонт, Belarusian: Даўмонт, Christian name Timothy, ; c. 1240? – 17 May 1299), was a Lithuanian prince best remembered as a military leader of the Principality of Pskov between 1266 and 1299. During his term in office, Pskov became de facto independent from Novgorod.

He is venerated as a saint in the Eastern Orthodox Church with his feast day observed on 20 May.

In Lithuania 
Until 1265, Daumantas was Duke of Nalšia, a northern province of the Grand Duchy of Lithuania, and was an ally of King Mindaugas. Mindaugas' and Daumantas' wives were sisters. In spite of the family relationship, Daumantas chose to ally himself with Mindaugas' nephew Treniota, who was Duke of Samogitia. Treniota had been steadily increasing his personal power within the kingdom as he tried to spark an all-Balts rebellion against the Teutonic Knights and the Livonian Order.

In 1263, Daumantas assassinated Mindaugas and two of his sons. It has been suggested that he acted in collusion with Treniota. As a result, the Grand Duchy of Lithuania relapsed into paganism for another one hundred and twenty years. Some Russian chronicles say that Daumantas' motive for the murder was to further his power and get revenge: after Queen Morta's death c. 1262, Mindaugas took Daumantas' wife for himself. When Mindaugas dispatched a large army towards Bryansk, Daumantas participated in the expedition, but suddenly returned and killed Mindaugas and two of his sons.

According to the Bychowiec Chronicle (a late and not very reliable source), Daumantas received the title of Duke of Utena as his reward.

When Vaišelga, the eldest son of Mindaugas, entered into an alliance with Shvarn of Halych-Volhynia in 1264, he was able to take revenge for his father's death by killing Treniota. Daumantas and his followers fled to Pskov.

Ruler of Pskov 

After arriving in Pskov, Daumantas was baptized into Eastern Orthodoxy, assumed the Christian name Timotheus (Russian: Timofei) and married a daughter of Dmitry of Pereslavl, son of Alexander Nevsky. He led Pskovian armies against the Lithuanians and defeated them on the bank of the Western Dvina, proceeded to devastate the land of Duke Gerdenis, and captured his two sons and wife. Daumantas' daring spirit, his friendly ways, and the success of his military enterprise persuaded the Pskovians to elect him as their knyaz, or military leader.

Daumantas' election was never sanctioned by the Novgorod Republic, which had traditionally controlled the Pskovian affairs. Prince Yaroslav of Novgorod planned to punish the Pskovians for their willfulness and oust Daumantas from the city, but the Novgorodians refused to support Yaroslav's campaign and, joining their forces with the Pskovians, invaded Lithuania the following year. Daumantas was again in command and returned to Pskov in triumph.

In January 1268 the Pskovian-Novgorodian alliance was cemented when they invaded Danish Estonia together. The Pskovians, led by Daumantas, joined their forces with the Novgorodians led by Alexander Nevsky's son Dmitry and looted the Danish Estonian countryside, but were defeated by the combined forces of vassals of the Danish crown, Livonian Knights and local Estonian militia in the Battle of Rakvere (18 February 1268, near modern-day Rakvere). The following year Master of the Livonian Order, Otto von Lutterberg, led the Livonian forces to the territory of Pskov, burned Izborsk castle and laid siege to Pskov itself, but Daumantas, after receiving support from the Novgorodians, managed to conclude a truce with the Livonians.

Later years and legacy

In 1270, Yaroslav again attempted to interfere into Pskovian affairs and to replace Daumantas with a puppet ruler. The Pskovians stood up for Daumantas, forcing Yaroslav to abandon his plans. In order to strengthen his position, Daumantas married Dmitry's daughter, Maria. In 1282, when his father-in-law was ousted from Vladimir to Koporye, Daumantas made a sally into Ladoga, where he captured Dmitry's treasury from the Novgorodians and transported it to Koporye. Thereupon his name disappears from the chronicles for some seventeen years.

In 1299, the Livonian Order unexpectedly invaded north-western Russia and laid siege to Pskov. Having expelled them from the republic, Daumantas abruptly lapsed into illness and died, survived by his alleged son, David of Hrodna. His body was buried in the Trinity Cathedral, where his sword and personal effects would be on exhibit until the 20th century.

According to Pskovian chronicles, no ruler was loved by the citizens of Pskov more than Daumantas; they particularly praise his military skills and wisdom. After the Russian Orthodox Church canonized him, he came to be regarded as a patron saint of Pskov (on par with Vsevolod Mstislavich). The fortifications erected by Dovmont in Pskov's downtown became known as the "Daumantas Town". A church to the memory of the blessed prince Daumantas-Timofei was consecrated there in 1574.

In the 1990s, Russian author Sergey Kalitin wrote a novel, Hour of the Wolf, about the life of Daumantas and his transition from a "minor Lithuanian noble" to Prince of Pskov.

References
In-line

General

 Entries for the years 1265–1299 in  provide information on Daumantas as the ruler of Pskov.

1240 births
1299 deaths
Year of birth uncertain
13th-century Christian saints
13th-century Lithuanian nobility
Eastern Orthodox royal saints
Eastern Orthodox monarchs
Russian rulers
Russian saints of the Eastern Orthodox Church
History of Pskov